The Constitutional Statute of Italy was the statute of the Kingdom of Italy, a client state of France the under Napoleon I. It was roughly what is now the northern regions of Friuli-Venezia Giulia, Lombardy, Trentino-Alto Adige and Veneto. The statute came into effect on 19 March 1805.

See also
Statuto Albertino
Constitution of Italy
Constitution of Italy (1802)

External links
 Text of the Constitution 

Law of Italy
1805 in the Kingdom of Italy (Napoleonic)
1805 in law
1805 documents
Constitution of Italy